Neurocolpus is a genus of plant bugs in the family Miridae. There are about 19 described species in Neurocolpus.

Species
These 19 species belong to the genus Neurocolpus:

 Neurocolpus arizonae Knight, 1934
 Neurocolpus brevicornis Henry, 1984
 Neurocolpus clavatus Henry & Kim, 1984
 Neurocolpus flavescens Blatchley, 1928
 Neurocolpus fuscicornis Henry & Kim, 1984
 Neurocolpus jessiae Knight, 1934
 Neurocolpus johnstoni Knight, 1934
 Neurocolpus knighti Henry, 1984
 Neurocolpus longicornis Henry & Kim, 1984
 Neurocolpus longirostris Knight, 1968
 Neurocolpus mexicanus Distant, 1883
 Neurocolpus montanus Knight, 1968
 Neurocolpus nicholi Knight, 1968
 Neurocolpus nubilus (Say, 1832) (clouded plant bug)
 Neurocolpus ornatus Henry & Kim, 1984
 Neurocolpus pumilus Henry, 1984
 Neurocolpus scutellatus Henry & Kim, 1984
 Neurocolpus simplex Van Duzee, 1918
 Neurocolpus tiliae Knight, 1934

References

Further reading

External links

 

Miridae genera
Articles created by Qbugbot
Mirini